19th NSFC Awards
January 3, 1985

Best Film: 
 Stranger Than Paradise 
The 19th National Society of Film Critics Awards, given on 3 January 1985, honored the best filmmaking of 1984.

Winners

Best Picture 
Stranger Than Paradise
Runner-up: A Sunday in the Country (Un dimanche à la campagne)

Best Director 
Robert Bresson – L'Argent
Runner-up: Bertrand Tavernier – A Sunday in the Country (Un dimanche à la campagne)

Best Actor 
Steve Martin – All of Me
Runner-up: Albert Finney – Under the Volcano

Best Actress 
Vanessa Redgrave – The Bostonians
Runner-up: Kathleen Turner – Romancing the Stone

Best Supporting Actor 
John Malkovich – Places in the Heart and The Killing Fields
Runner-up: Ralph Richardson – Greystoke: The Legend of Tarzan, Lord of the Apes

Best Supporting Actress 
Melanie Griffith – Body Double
Runner-up: Peggy Ashcroft – A Passage to India

Best Screenplay 
Lowell Ganz, Babaloo Mandel and Bruce Jay Friedman – Splash
Runner-up: Bertrand Tavernier and Colo Tavernier – A Sunday in the Country (Un dimanche à la campagne)

Best Cinematography 
Chris Menges – Comfort and Joy and The Killing Fields

Best Documentary 
Stop Making Sense

References

External links
Past Awards

1984
National Society of Film Critics Awards
National Society of Film Critics Awards
National Society of Film Critics Awards